Brad Keller (born December 30, 1979) is a volleyball coach and former player. He is currently the head coach at the University of Southern California. Keller has also been an assistant coach for the USC men's volleyball,  UC Irvine men's volleyball, UConn women's volleyball, UCLA men's volleyball. He was most recently an associate head coach for UCLA women's volleyball for the 2019 season.

Personal
Brad Keller grew up in Northern California, having graduated from Bellarmine College Prep. He has a younger brother, Jarod, who played libero for Stanford (2006-2009).

College playing career
Keller played at Loyola Marymount University for the 1999 and 2000 seasons before the school dropped the program. Keller graduate from LMU in 2002 with a bachelor’s degree in graphic design with a minor in marketing.

Before college coaching
Keller was the owner, director, and a coach of Bay to Bay, a boys’ volleyball club in Northern California, from 2000-06. His club won a pair of silver medals at the Junior Olympics and produced numerous NCAA Division I student-athletes.

Coaching career
Brad Keller got his collegiate coaching start with the men's volleyball team at USC. He coached the Trojans for four seasons that included a run to the 2009 NCAA Tournament Finals. He coached two All-Americans during his first tenure with the Trojans. In 2011, he coached both the UC Irvine men's volleyball program and UConn women's volleyball program. At UC Irvine, he would coach under John Speraw, a head coach that he would coach under for another six years with UCLA men's volleyball team. 

With the UCLA men's volleyball team, Keller helped guide the Bruins to a 2016 NCAA Tournament Semifinals appearance and 2018 NCAA Tournament Finals appearance. In January 2019, Keller moved down the hall at the Morgan Center, and became the associate head coach for the UCLA women's volleyball team. Keller helped bring in four top-ranked recruiting classes, and ten Bruins were named All-Americans during his tenure in Westwood. 

On February 20, Keller was named the head coach for the USC women's volleyball team after Brent Crouch left USC to take the Auburn women's volleyball head coaching position.

References

1979 births
Living people
American men's volleyball players
American volleyball coaches
USC Trojans women's volleyball coaches
USC Trojans men's volleyball coaches
UCLA Bruins men's volleyball coaches
UCLA Bruins women's volleyball coaches